Verbesina, many species of which have crownbeard as part of their common names, is a genus of flowering plants, in the family Asteraceae. It is a large genus of about 350 species.

All the species bear white or yellow flowers similar to small sunflowers. The name Verbesina very likely refers to the similarity of the foliage to that of the (unrelated) Verbena.

Verbesina species are used as food plants by the larvae of some Lepidoptera species. These include Schinia bina, which has been recorded from V. encelioides, and Schinia siren which feeds exclusively on that species.

Pollen grains from eight of the nine species of Verbesina found in Brazil have been characterized as oblate-spheroidal, medium-sized, isopolar monads. They are 3-colplorate with a subtriangular amb, a small polar area, a long colpus, a lalongate endoaperture, a caveate exine and an echinate sexine.

Selected species

 Verbesina alternifolia 
 Verbesina auriculigera
 Verbesina barclayae
 Verbesina brachypoda
 Verbesina chapmanii
 Verbesina dissita
 Verbesina ecuatoriana
 Verbesina encelioides 
 Verbesina gigantea
 Verbesina glabrata
 Verbesina grisebachii
 Verbesina guatemalensis
 Verbesina harlingii
 Verbesina hastata
 Verbesina helianthoides
 Verbesina howardiana
 Verbesina kingii
 Verbesina latisquama
 Verbesina mameana
 Verbesina minuticeps
 Verbesina occidentalis
 Verbesina pentantha
 Verbesina persicifolia
 Verbesina petrobioides
 Verbesina pseudoclausseni
 Verbesina pustulata
 Verbesina rivetii
 Verbesina rupestris
 Verbesina saloyensis
 Verbesina squarrosa
 Verbesina subcordata
 Verbesina villonacoensis
 Verbesina virginica

References

 
Asteraceae genera
Taxa named by Carl Linnaeus